The Kerala State Film Award for Best Story is an honour, begun in 1969, presented annually at the Kerala State Film Award of India to a writer for the best story in a Malayalam film. Until 1997, the awards were managed directly by the Department of Cultural Affairs of the Government of Kerala. Since 1998, the awards have been constituted by the Kerala State Chalachitra Academy, an autonomous, non-profit institution functioning under the Department of Cultural Affairs. The awardees are decided by an independent jury constituted every year. They are announced by the Minister for Cultural Affairs and are presented by the Chief Minister.

Throughout the years, accounting for ties and repeat winners, the Government of Kerala has presented a total of 51 Best Story awards to 44 different writers. As of 2020, the only writer to have won the prize in consecutive years is Padmarajan, in 1978 and 1979.

Winners

References

Official website
PRD, Govt. of Kerala: Awardees List

Kerala State Film Awards